Denis Bernard Herron (born June 18, 1952) is a Canadian former professional ice hockey goaltender who played for the Montreal Canadiens, Kansas City Scouts, and Pittsburgh Penguins in the National Hockey League.

Playing career
Herron played junior hockey with the Trois-Rivières Ducs of the Quebec Junior Hockey League. He had a good junior career and in 1972, he was named to the Second All-Star Team with the Trois-Rivières Ducs. In 1972, Herron was drafted 40th overall by the Pittsburgh Penguins. In his first season, he split his time between the Penguins, and the Hershey Bears of the AHL. In 1974, Herron played for three teams. He played for the Pittsburgh Penguins, the Hershey Bears and the Salt Lake Golden Eagles. Next season, Herron played the first half of the season with the Pens and the Bears before being traded to the Kansas City Scouts. He played 22 games with them that season and spent another year in Kansas City before becoming a free agent.

While playing for Kansas City, Herron put himself on a diet consisting of high-protein milkshakes in an effort to gain size and strength. In January of 1976, he was taken to Baptist Hospital in Kansas City after suffering a kidney stone believed to have been a result of the milkshakes. (Icing on the Plains: The Rough Ride of Kansas City's NHL Scouts, pp. 193-194)

He was signed by Pittsburgh again and played with them for the next three years. In 1978, Herron made an appearance with Team Canada in the World Championships where he won a bronze medal.

In 1979, the Penguins traded him to the Montreal Canadiens. He remained with the Canadiens for the next three years where he shared goaltending duties. In 1981, Herron was awarded the Vezina Trophy with teammates Michel Larocque and Richard Sevigny. In 1982, Herron shared the William M. Jennings Trophy with fellow netminder Rick Wamsley.

In 1983, Herron returned to Pittsburgh for the third time in his career. He remained there until 1986, when he retired.

Personal life
Herron is the third of six children born to a mechanic with the Imperial Tobacco Company and a stay-at-home mother.

He is married to Debbie Pike, of St. Lambert Quebec and has two daughters, Elissa and Mandi.

His brother Ronald was also a professional goalie, having played in France, and his niece Catherine Herron tended nets for the women's Marlet team at McGill University. She also won the 2012 Clarkson Cup as a backup goaltender for the Montreal Stars of the CWHL

Awards and achievements
 Selected to the QMJHL Second All-Star Team in 1972.
 Vezina Trophy winner in 1981 (shared with Michel Larocque and Richard Sevigny).
 William M. Jennings Trophy winner in 1982 (shared with Rick Wamsley).

Career statistics

Regular season and playoffs

International

References
Herron finds room at the inn; Ian MacDonald. The Gazette. Montreal, Que.: Dec 23, 2004. pg. C.3

Icing on the Plains: The Rough Ride of Kansas City's NHL Scouts, Troy Treasure, 2018, Balboa Press

External links
 

1952 births
Living people
Baltimore Skipjacks players
Canadian ice hockey goaltenders
Hershey Bears players
Ice hockey people from Quebec
Kansas City Scouts players
Montreal Canadiens players
People from Chambly, Quebec
Pittsburgh Penguins draft picks
Pittsburgh Penguins players
Trois-Rivières Ducs players
Vezina Trophy winners
William M. Jennings Trophy winners